Trachyte Creek is a stream in Garfield County, Utah, United States.

The creek was named from the boulders resembling trachyte lining the creek.

See also
List of rivers of Utah

References

Rivers of Garfield County, Utah
Rivers of Utah